Vision Four is a supplier of advertising-supported cable TV to hotels in Malaysia and Singapore.  It was established in 1982

Programmes are in English and include movies, dramas, lifestyle programmes and documentaries.

External links

Vision KL, a magazine owned by Vision Four Media Group
Malaysia International Gourmet Festival (MIGF), an event organized by Vision Four Media Group

References

1982 establishments in Malaysia
Television in Malaysia
Television channels and stations established in 1982